Dendropsophus meridensis is a species of frog in the family Hylidae.
It is endemic to Venezuela.
Its natural habitats are subtropical or tropical moist montane forests, freshwater marshes, and intermittent freshwater marshes.
It is threatened by habitat loss.

References

meridensis
Amphibians described in 1961
Taxonomy articles created by Polbot